Yasmien Yuson Kurdi-Soldevilla (born January 25, 1989) is a Filipino actress, singer and model. She was one of the Final Four in the first season of StarStruck, a reality-based talent search show by GMA Network in the Philippines, where she finished as first runner-up. Yasmien Kurdi graduated magna cum laude from Arellano University with a degree of Bachelor of Arts in political science.

She is known for the roles of Mira in the hit fantasy series Encantadia, Salve Dizon de Leon in the remake of Babangon Ako't Dudurugin Kita and Shayne Rodrigo in the hit remake Saan Darating Ang Umaga?, a role originally played by Maricel Soriano. She was also known in Rhodora X as Angela, Dolores in the hit afternoon drama series Yagit and Ysabel in the hit Sa Piling ni Nanay which extended many times due to high ratings.

As a singer, Kurdi released two studio albums. Her first album, In the Name of Love was released in 2006 and attained platinum status while in 2007, her second album, Love Is All I Need, reached gold status.

Early life
Kurdi was born to a Muslim father, Mohammad Kurdi, and Miriam Ong-Yuson, who is a member of the Iglesia ni Cristo. She is of Lebanese and Chinese Filipino (maternal) descent. She spent most of her early life in Kuwait because of her father's work there, and was there with her family during the Gulf War. She was a member of the junior choir in her church before joining StarStruck. She studied elementary in Jabriya Indian School, high school in Angelicum College and graduated magna cum laude with a degree of political science in Arellano University.

Career

2003–2006: Starstruck, career beginnings, and In The Name of Love
Her early career included modeling for Candy, Seventeen, and MOD magazine. She was one of the finalists in ABS-CBN's ASAP Pond's Soft Skin Search, but lost to the Jaboom twins.

2007–2011: Breakthrough and Love Is All I Need
In May 2007, after her success in the Bakekang series as "Charming", Kurdi starred in Pati Ba Pintig ng Puso with JC de Vera. She played Jenna, a maid who has an eye on her employer's grandson. In its press conference, GMA Network crowned her as its GMA Drama Princess. On September 10, 2007, Kurdi starred again with JC de Vera in Pasan Ko Ang Daigdig, which originally starred Sharon Cuneta in 1987. After their huge success as a loveteam in Pati Ba Pintig ng Puso, GMA cast them both in Sine Novela.

The network gave them an adaptation of another Sharon Cuneta movie, Babangon Ako't Dudurugin Kita. The series crushed its rival My Girl. In the last quarter of 2008, Kurdi led the remake of Saan Darating Ang Umaga? which garnered prime time ratings, though it aired in the afternoon. The Sine Novela is a top rater and the all-time highest in national TV ratings, never beaten by Dapat Ka Bang Mahalin? which held the Mega Manila only.

Kurdi then appeared on Dear Friend: Madrasta, which topped the weekend daytime ratings. She then starred in SRO Cinemaseryes suspense drama Suspetsa.

In 2010, Kurdi was cast in her first role as a villain, on the GMA Network fairy tale television series Grazilda.

2011–2017: Rising popularity
In 2011, Kurdi joined the epic series Amaya for a multi-episode guest arc playing Apila, she then quit show business to concentrate on her college education and raising a family, coming back in 2013 after a two-year hiatus. Recently, she starred in the hit afternoon drama series Sa Piling ni Nanay where she played a surrogate mother.

2018: Critical acclaim

In 2018, after 1 year of being hiatus, she made her TV comeback in Hindi Ko Kayang Iwan Ka. It became a big-hit in the country and bagged the Best Drama Actress in the 32nd PMPC Star Awards for TV.

Personal life
In 2013, Kurdi revealed to Philippine Entertainment Portal that she had been married to Rey Soldevilla, who is a pilot on January 25, 2012 (her 23rd birthday). On November 22, 2012, she gave birth to a daughter named Ayesha Zara, whose name Ayesha means "she who lives" or "womanly" in the Arabic language, and name Zara means "beautiful, bright, shining and brilliant" or "flower, blossom, or beauty" in the Arabic language.

Health
In early 2014, Kurdi was diagnosed with a cyst on her vocal folds, which explained the recent hoarseness in her voice. She was scheduled for surgery in July 2014 to remove the cyst. According to her doctor, there was no guarantee that her voice would fully recover after the operation.

Filmography

Television
{|class="wikitable" style="font-size: 102%;"
|+ Television performances
|-
! scope="col" | Year
! scope="col" | Title
! scope="col" | Role

! scope="col" | Network
|-
| rowspan="1" | 2003—2004 ||StarStruck || Herself || rowspan="44" | GMA Network
|-
| rowspan="4" | 2004 || Stage 1: Live! ||  Herself
|-
| Stage 1: The StarStruck Playhouse || Herself 
|-
| Click || Leilani 
|-
| Click Barkada Hunt|| Herself
|-
| 2004—2010 || SOP Rules || Herself 
|-
| 2004—2006 || SOP Gigsters ||  Herself 
|-
| 2004—2005 || Joyride || Rene / Irene
|-
| rowspan="2" | 2005 ||  Encantadia || Mira
|-
| Love To Love (Season 6): Wish Upon A Jar || Neneng 
|-
| 2005—2007 || Hokus Pokus || Jackie 
|-
| rowspan="2" | 2006 || Bleach|| Rukia Kuchiki 
|-
| Now and Forever: Tinig || Victoria / Ikay 
|-
| 2006—2007 ||Carlo J. Caparas' Bakekang || Charming Maisog / Lokresha / Karisma
|-
| 2007 || Sine Novela: Pati Ba Pintig ng Puso|| Jenna
|-
| 2007—2008|| Sine Novela:  Pasan Ko ang Daigdig|| Lupe Velez  
|-
| rowspan="3"| 2008 || Bleach: Season 2 || Rukia Kuchiki 
|-
| Babangon Ako't Dudurugin Kita || Salve Dizon
|-
|  Carlo J. Caparas' Tasya Fantasya || Tasya
|-
| 2008—2009 || Sine Novela: Saan Darating ang Umaga? || Shayne Rodrigo
|-
| rowspan="3"| 2009 || SRO Cinemaserye: Suspetsa || Leonor 
|-
| Dear Friend: Madrasta || Princess / Shiela Gomez   
|-
| All My Life || Princess
|-
| 2010 || Pilyang Kerubin || Hannah
|-
| 2010—2011 || Grazilda || Cindy 
|-
| 2011—2012 || Amaya || Apila 
|-
| 2013 ||Anna Karenina || Margarita "Maggie" Monteclaro 
|-
| 2014 || Rhodora X || Angela Ferrer 
|-
| 2014—2015 || Yagit || Dolores "Dolor" Macabuhay-Guison
|-
| 2015 || Magpakailanman: Nuno Sa Punso || Flor 
|-
| 2016 || Wagas || Mitch 
|-
| 2016—2017 ||Sa Piling ni Nanay || Ysabel Salvacion / Zeny 
|-
| rowspan="3"| 2017 || Dear Uge || Mylene
|-
| Tadhana || Connie
|-
| Magpakailanman: Anak Mo, Anak Ko, Anak Natin || Mary Jane 
|-
| rowspan="3"| 2018 || Hindi Ko Kayang Iwan Ka || Thea Balagtas-Angeles
|-
| Dear Uge: Beki Boyfie || Mina
|-
| Magpakailanman: The Haunted Wife || Inday
|-
| 2019 || Hiram na Anak || Miren Alonta
|-
| 2019—2020 || Beautiful Justice || Alicia "Alice" Santos-Vida
|-
| 2020 ||  I Can See You: The Promise || Clarisse Agoncillo
|- 
| 2021—2022 
|  Las Hermanas || Dorothy Manansala
|-
| 2022
| Start-Up PH || Katrina Sison / Ina Diaz
|-
| 2023
| The Missing Husband || TBA 
|}

Films

Discography

In 2005, Kurdi released her first album, In the Name of Love, under GMA Records. She released her first single, "I Know" (which was used as a Filipino soundtrack of the Korean teledrama Sweet 18 aired by GMA), followed by "In the Name of Love" and "Umaambisyon" in the same year. In 2007 she released her second album, Love Is All I Need, which included the singles "Candlelight Romance", "Goodbye", "Kisapmata", "One Day", "Take It or Leave It", "Even If" and  "Love Is All I Need".

Studio albums
 In the Name of Love (2005)
 Love Is All I Need'' (2007)

Awards and nominations

References

External links

Yasmien Kurdi at iGMA.tv

1989 births
Living people
Actresses from Metro Manila
Converts to Roman Catholicism from Unitarianism
Kurdish Christians
Filipino child actresses
Filipino women pop singers
Filipino people of Chinese descent
Filipino people of Kurdish descent
Filipino people of Lebanese descent
Filipino Roman Catholics
Filipino television actresses
Filipino voice actresses
Former members of Iglesia ni Cristo
GMA Music artists
GMA Network personalities
New Era University alumni
People from Quezon City
People from San Juan, Metro Manila
StarStruck (Philippine TV series) participants
Tagalog people
21st-century Filipino singers
21st-century Filipino women singers